is a Japanese speed skater. She competed at the 1984 Winter Olympics and the 1988 Winter Olympics.

References

1965 births
Living people
Japanese female speed skaters
Olympic speed skaters of Japan
Speed skaters at the 1984 Winter Olympics
Speed skaters at the 1988 Winter Olympics
People from Tomakomai, Hokkaido
Speed skaters at the 1986 Asian Winter Games
Medalists at the 1986 Asian Winter Games
Asian Games medalists in speed skating
Asian Games silver medalists for Japan
Asian Games bronze medalists for Japan
20th-century Japanese women
21st-century Japanese women